Herbie Hancock Trio is an album by Herbie Hancock released on September 21, 1977, in Japan. It includes performances with bassist  Ron Carter and drummer Tony Williams. A second selection of six tracks recorded by the trio during the same day's sessions was released under Ron Carter's name as Third Plane.

This is the first of two albums with the same title. A second Herbie Hancock Trio with the same personnel was released in 1982.

Track listing
 "Watch It" – 12:25  
 "Speak Like a Child" – 13:06  
 "Watcha Waitin' For" – 6:20  
 "Look" – 7:42  
 "Milestones" (Miles Davis) – 6:40  
All compositions by Herbie Hancock, except as indicated.

Personnel
Musicians
Herbie Hancock – piano
Ron Carter – bass
Tony Williams – drums

Production
David Rubinson – producer
Fred Catero – engineer
Bryan Bell – technical assistance
Kevin Ayres – technical assistance
Akio Nimbari – art direction, design
Ikuo Niida – artwork
Osamu Konno – photography

References

1977 albums
Herbie Hancock albums
Albums produced by Dave Rubinson
Columbia Records albums